Francisco Gavidia University (UFG) is a university located in San Salvador, El Salvador. The university was named after the famous Salvadoran scholar, Francisco Gavidia.

References

External links

Francisco Gavidia University official website 

San Salvador
Universities in El Salvador
Universities established in the 1980s